Listed below are the dates and results for the 1986 FIFA World Cup qualification rounds for the African zone (CAF). For an overview of the qualification rounds, see the article 1986 FIFA World Cup qualification.

A total of 29 CAF teams entered the competition. The African Zone was allocated 2 places (out of 24) in the final tournament.

Format
There would be four rounds of play:
 First Round: 3 teams, Algeria, Cameroon and Ghana, received byes and advanced to the Second Round directly. The remaining 26 teams were paired up to play knockout matches on a home-and-away basis. The winners would advance to the Second Round.
 Second Round and Third Round: In each of these rounds, the teams were paired up to play knockout matches on a home-and-away basis. The winners would advance to the next round, until there would be 4 teams left.
 Final Round: The 4 teams were paired up to play knockout matches on a home-and-away basis. The winners would qualify.

First round 

|}

Egypt won 2–1 on agg. and advanced to the Second Round.

Kenya won 5–4 on agg. and advanced to the Second Round.

Malawi won 5–0 on agg. and advanced to the Second Round.

Zambia won 3–1 on agg. and advanced to the Second Round.

Sudan advanced to the Second Round on away goals after a draw 1–1 on agg.

Morocco won 5–0 on agg. and advanced to the Second Round.

Tunisia won 6–0 on agg. and advanced to the Second Round.

Ivory Coast won 6–3 on agg. and advanced to the Second Round.

Nigeria won 4–0 on agg. and advanced to the Second Round.

Angola advanced to the Second Round on penalties after a draw won 1–1 on agg.

Madagascar advanced to the Second Round, Lesotho withdrew.

Libya advanced to the Second Round, Niger withdrew.

Guinea advanced to the Second Round, Togo withdrew.

Second round 

|}

Zambia won 5–2 on agg. and advanced to the Third Round.

Morocco won 2–0 on agg. and advanced to the Third Round.

Algeria won 3–2 on agg. and advanced to the Third Round.

Nigeria won 6–1 on agg. and advanced to the Third Round.

Egypt advanced to the Third Round on penalties after a draw 1–1 on agg.

Tunisia won 2–1 on agg. and advanced to the Third Round.

Libya won 4–0 on agg. and advanced to the Third Round.

Ghana won 2–0 on agg. and advanced to the Third Round.

Third round 

|}

Algeria won 3–0 on agg. and advanced to the Final Round.

Libya won 2–0 on agg. and advanced to the Final Round.

Tunisia won 2–1 on agg. and advanced to the Final Round.

Morocco won 2–0 on agg. and advanced to the Final Round.

Final round

|}

Algeria won 7–1 on agg. and qualified for the 1986 FIFA World Cup.

Morocco won 3–1 on agg. and qualified for the 1986 FIFA World Cup.

Qualified teams

1 Bold indicates champions for that year. Italic indicates hosts for that year.

Goalscorers

5 goals

 Bassam Jeridi

4 goals

 Djamel Menad
 Mustapha Merry

3 goals

 Rabah Madjer
 Abdoulaye Traoré
 Joe Masiga
 Michael Chabala

2 goals

 Tedj Bensaoula
 Emad Suleiman
 Mulugeta Kebede
 Frank Sinalo
 Aziz Bouderbala
 Saad Dahane
 Mohamed Timoumi
 Humphrey Edobor
 Rashidi Yekini
 Mohamed Gasri
 Abdelkader Rakbaoui

1 goal

 Nasser Bouiche
 Mohamed Kaci-Saïd
 Faouzi Mansouri
 Hocine Yahi
 Jesus
 Eduardo Machado
 Ivo Raimundo Traça
 André Kana-Biyik
 Louis-Paul M'Fédé
 Oumar Ben Salah
 Kouassi N'Dri
 Joël Tiéhi
 Alaa Mayhoub
 Gebremedhin Haile
 Dagne Tesfaye
 Cheikh Ndour
 Baboucar Sowe
 Bai Malleh Wadda
 George Alhassan
 Opoku Nti
 Alsény Diaby
 Sammy Ayoyi
 Sammy Onyango
 Sam Tabu
 Ali Al-Beshari
 Abdel Razak Al-Farjani
 Ibrahim Al-Maadani
 Ayad Al-Qadi
 Reda Al-Senussi
 Aboubaker Bani
 Abubaker Ben Brahim
 Herilia Rafanodina
 Ricky Phuka
 Harry Waya
 Mustapha El Haddaoui
 Khalid Labied
 Ademola Adeshina
 Fatai Amoo
 Okey Isima
 Stephen Keshi
 Dahiru Sadi
 Yisa Sofoluwe
 Clement Temile
 Abdou Karim Sèye
 Mazda
 Peter Tino
 Hakim Braham
 Lotfi Hsoumi
 Godfrey Katerega
 Kalusha Bwalya
 Jones Chilengi
 Fanny Hangunyu
 Lucky Msiska
 Aaron Njovu

1 own goal

 Hamada Sedki (playing against Zimbabwe)
 Bernard Leclézio (playing against Malawi)

See also 
 1986 FIFA World Cup qualification (UEFA)
 1986 FIFA World Cup qualification (CONMEBOL)
 1986 FIFA World Cup qualification (CONCACAF)
 1986 FIFA World Cup qualification (AFC)
 1986 FIFA World Cup qualification (OFC)

External links
1986 FIFA World Cup qualification (Zone Africa) - fifa.com
1986 FIFA World Cup qualification details (Zone Africa) - rsssf.com

CAF
FIFA World Cup qualification (CAF)
Qual
Qual